Tobias Hans (born 1 February 1978) is a German politician of the Christian Democratic Union (CDU) who served as Minister-President of Saarland from 2018 to 2022.

Political career
Hans became a member of the Landtag of Saarland after the Saarland state election in 2009. On 24 November 2015, Hans was elected as chairman of the CDU Parliamentary Group in the Landtag of Saarland.

As one of the Saarland's representatives at the Bundesrat, Hans serves on the Committee on Foreign Affairs, the Committee on Defence and the Committee on Cultural Affairs. He is also a member of the German-French Friendship Group set up by the Bundesrat and the French Senate.

Hans was a CDU delegate to the Federal Convention for the purpose of electing the President of Germany in 2017 and 2022.

On 1 March 2018, Hans was elected as Minister-President of Saarland by a 40 to 11 vote. He is the youngest serving head of a German state government.

Amid the COVID-19 pandemic in Germany, Hans co-chaired – alongside Silvia Breher, Hendrik Hoppenstedt, Yvonne Magwas and Paul Ziemiak – the CDU’s first ever digital national convention in 2021.

Other activities
 Cultural Foundation of the German States (KdL), chairman of the council
 Deutsches Museum, ex officio member of the board of trustees
 RAG-Stiftung, ex officio member of the board of trustees (since 2018)

Political positions
Ahead of the Christian Democrats’ leadership election in 2018, Hans publicly endorsed Annegret Kramp-Karrenbauer to succeed Angela Merkel as the party's chair. For the 2021 national elections, he later supported Markus Söder as the Christian Democrats' joint candidate to succeed Merkel as Chancellor.

References

External links 
 Personal website

|-

Ministers-President of Saarland
1978 births
Living people
Christian Democratic Union of Germany politicians
Members of the Landtag of Saarland